The 1972–73 Hong Kong First Division League season was the 62nd since its establishment.

League table

References
1972–73 Hong Kong First Division table (RSSSF)

Hong
Hong Kong First Division League seasons
football